Varesino, Varesotto or Bosin (from the name of storytellers; see bosinada) is a dialect of Western Lombard language spoken in the Central province of Varese. The Northern side speaks more Ticinese than Bosin. The Southern side speaks more Bustocco.

Example

Ta sa regordat? by Speri Della Chiesa Jemoli

...

Translation (Do you remember?)
Do you remember – my sweet Lucia
The first time – we talked to each other?...
It was the festival – [of the sanctuary] of the Schirannetta...
We met – there on the parvis

You wore a dress – all flowery...
To rush you – I pinched you...
You blushed – as I stared at you...
You slapped me – I got your slap...

But your hand [] – was so pretty
That on my face – it never hurt...
We made peace – with a small apple,
Small fish, soda – and cotton candy...

I bought you two hooves – with a bow on...
My word – you accepted it...
(I kept in stock – three cows in the byre)
And after Easter – we got married...

Now you are old – my sweet Lucia,
And I am no longer able – to play the fool...
But when I see – the Schirannetta
I still hear the sounds – I used to hear as your valentine!

Western Lombard language